Rasah Jaya is a township in the Rasah area in Seremban, Negeri Sembilan, Malaysia. This township was opened in 1982.

Educations
Sekolah Kebangsaan Taman Rasah Jaya

Populated places in Negeri Sembilan